PSR J0437−4715 is a pulsar. Discovered in the Parkes 70 cm survey, it remains the closest and brightest millisecond pulsar (MSP) known.  The pulsar rotates about its axis 173.7 times per second and therefore completes a rotation every 5.75 milliseconds.  It emits a searchlight-like radio beam that sweeps past the Earth each time it rotates.  Currently the most precisely located object outside of the Solar System, PSR J0437-4715 is 156.3 parsecs or 509.8 light-years distant.

This pulsar is distinguished by being the most stable natural clock known and is debatably more stable than man-made atomic clocks. Its stability is about one part in 1015.  Two other pulsars, PSR B1855+09 and PSR B1937+21 are known to be comparable in stability to atomic clocks, or about 3 parts in 1014.

PSR J0437−4715 is the first MSP to have its X-ray emission detected and studied in detail.  It is also the first of only two pulsars to have the full three-dimensional orientation of its orbit determined.

Optical observations indicate that the binary companion of PSR J0437-4715 is most likely a low-mass helium white dwarf.
The pulsar is about 1.4 solar mass and the companion is about 0.25 . The pair revolve around each other every 5.75 days in nearly perfect circular orbits.

See also
Binary pulsar

References

Pictor (constellation)
Millisecond pulsars
Binary stars